Friends of the British Overseas Territories (FOTBOT) is a charitable and youth organisation based in the United Kingdom that seeks to raise awareness of the fourteen British Overseas Territories (BOTs) by promoting their culture, history and bio-diversity. As an educational charity, it facilitates visits to BOTs for mainland British students, and has also pledged to alleviate certain financial constraints faced in the UK by students from the BOTs themselves. Such efforts are supported by regular fundraising activities, as well as through the backing of several prominent British politicians.

Founded in Leeds by sole Chief Executive, Philip Smith, in 2013, FOTBOT has since been consulted by various national media organisations on articles regarding British relations with its dependencies. At least two university associations have been founded in assistance of the organisation's objectives.

Foundation and development 
The organisation was founded in 2013 by Philip Smith, predominantly as a vehicle to foster ties between the young people of the United Kingdom and the sparsely located British Overseas Territories (BOTs), a group of 16 dependencies under the ultimate sovereignty and jurisdiction of the UK, having been former colonies of the British Empire. Its headquarters are currently based in Leeds, a city in Yorkshire.

Its unofficial flag, reminiscent of that of many BOTs and depicted only on membership badges, was the result of an internal design competition and is registered with the Flags of the World association. Though falling outside of its stated charitable aims, FOTBOT is regularly consulted by media organisations regarding political developments in the BOTs. Instances have included an article published by The i, in which the charity expressed its disappointment that BOTs, excluding Gibraltar, would be unable to vote in the 2016 European Union membership referendum; more emotively, FOTBOT were quoted in The Times as considering the British Government's 2018 motion to demand that the British Virgin Islands publicly declare the owners of its businesses as "bring[ing] in the feeling of a colonial master again". Several politicians have declared their support for the organisation, including Conservative Member of Parliament (MP) Andrew Rosindell, former Secretary of State for International Development, Priti Patel, and Julia Reid, a UK Independence Party (UKIP) Member of the European Parliament (MEP). Historically, at least two student unions, at the universities of Cambridge and Newcastle respectively, have been affiliated with membership societies seeking to further the objectives of FOTBOT.

Activities 
Established foremostly as a youth organisation, FOTBOT have oriented much of their activities toward educating young people, a motivation that has facilitated short excursions for British students to BOTs, as well as for students from the BOTs themselves to visit other dependencies and study in the UK without undue financial burden. In this vein, FOTBOT was partnered in a project headed by geographer Stewart McPherson, 'Treasure Islands', which "aim[ed] to showcase the wildlife, cultures and history of all of the UK Overseas Territories" by dispersing educative materials across the UK.

As an organisation, FOTBOT host regular ticketed events that range from formal functions to round-table discussions surrounding the cultural and political situation of the BOTs; past committees have explored the possibility of BOT representation in the UK Parliament, as well as the challenges of day-to-day governance in British protectorates.

References

Citations 

British Overseas Territories
Cultural charities based in the United Kingdom
Educational charities based in the United Kingdom
Organisations based in Leeds
Organizations established in 2013
Youth charities based in the United Kingdom